The Apenkwa Interchange is a dual carriage road system flyover in Accra in the Greater Accra Region of Ghana. It is part of the six-lane,  George Walker Bush Highway constructed under the Millennium Challenge Account.

References
 

Road interchanges in Ghana
Roads in Ghana